Erebus ipsa is a moth of the family Erebidae first described by Charles Swinhoe in 1918. It is found in Sri Lanka.

References

Moths described in 1918
Erebus (moth)